The Queen's Bridge is a bridge spanning the Raritan River that connects South Bound Brook and Bound Brook, both of which are in Somerset County, New Jersey. The bridge carries South Main Street across the river.

History
One of the earliest bridges at this site was a wooden one built in 1767. Later, in 1771, an act was passed that provided for the maintenance of the bridge as the Queen's Bridge. Over a hundred years later, a class steel pipe truss bridge was built at the site in 1875 to replace the previous one. The current bridge's span was built in 1984.

Bound Brook, New Jersey
South Bound Brook, New Jersey
Bridges in Somerset County, New Jersey
Road bridges in New Jersey
Bridges over the Raritan River